Carrsville is a census-designated place (CDP) in Isle of Wight County in the Hampton Roads region of southeastern Virginia in the United States. The population as of the 2010 Census was 359. The town is named for Jesse Carr, whose family had long roots in Isle of Wight County.  Jesse Carr died in the place that would later bear his name.

Carrsville was located on the Portsmouth and Roanoke Railroad, built through the area in the mid-1830s to provide a link between the Roanoke River and the port areas of Norfolk and Portsmouth. The railroad is now part of CSX Transportation.

History
According to Civil War Encyclopedia,  on November 17, 1862, 150 Union soldiers encountered and fought with 400 Confederate cavalry between Carrsville and Holland's corners. No casualties were reported.

In May, 1862, Union forces controlled Norfolk and Portsmouth, Virginia. The Union army had a garrison at Suffolk, fifteen miles east of Carrsville. Between April 11 and May 4, 1863, Lt. General James Longstreet, leading three Confederate divisions, unsuccessfully attempted to capture this garrison in what became the Siege of Suffolk.

Approximately five miles west of Carrsville is the Blackwater River where 9,000 Confederate soldiers were dug in for 50 miles stretching from north of Zuni to the North Carolina line.

After the Siege of Suffolk ended, Union troops under VII Corps were sent to Carrsville to cover the construction of a section of the Seaboard & Roanoke Railroad from Suffolk to the Blackwater River. 36 miles of railroad were completed between May 12-26.

During the construction, on May 15, 1863, Union soldiers encountered confederate military resistance near the Holland House. Confederates fired approximately sixty shot and shell at the railroad before advancing and being, “driven back with heavy loss.”

The VII Corps regiments at Carrsville were the 6th Regiment Massachusetts Volunteer Militia, 7th Massachusetts Infantry Regiment, 112th Regiment, New York Infantry, 170th New York Infantry Regiment, 182nd New York Infantry Regiment, 165th Pennsylvania Regiment, and the 167th Pennsylvania Infantry Regiment.

In the Battle of Carrsville, also known as the Battle of Holland House, five soldiers in the 6th Regiment Massachusetts were killed, twelve were wounded and five were taken prisoner.

“For his heroic service at Carrsville Private Joseph Sewell-Gerrish Sweatt of Company C, 6th Regiment Massachusetts, was awarded the Congressional Medal of Honor. “When ordered to retreat, this soldier turned and rushed back to the front, in the face of heavy fire from the enemy, in an endeavor to rescue his wounded comrades, remaining by them until overpowered and taken prisoner.”

Charles H. Bushee of Company E, 112th Regiment, New York Infantry, wrote in his diary about there being, “a sharp skirmish,” in Carrsville on May 14, 15, and 16, 1863.

In his Tidewater News article, Civil War history, battlefields are all around us, Volpe Boykin wrote that the Carrsville Elementary School on Route 58 was the, “area between the battle lines of Union and Confederate infantry and artillery.”

Boykin wrote that Private Anson Thurston and his father, Joel Thurston, both served in the 6th Regiment Massachusetts, and were wounded and captured at Carrsville and brought to Franklin where the younger Thurston died from his wounds. The elder Thurston was then sent to a prison in Richmond.

Geography
Carrsville is in southern Isle of Wight County and is bordered to the southeast by the independent city of Suffolk. U.S. Route 58 Business passes through the center of the community, leading west  to Franklin and east  to the center of Suffolk.

Climate
The climate in this area is characterized by hot, humid summers and generally mild to cool winters.  According to the Köppen Climate Classification system, Carrsville has a humid subtropical climate, abbreviated "Cfa" on climate maps.

References

Census-designated places in Isle of Wight County, Virginia
Unincorporated communities in Virginia
Census-designated places in Virginia